The Melaka Public Library is the state library of Melaka, Malaysia. It is managed under the Melaka Public Library Corporation.

History
The very first library in Malacca was the Khutub Khanah Melaka, established in 1881 and was located at the Stadthuys. After the independence of Malaya in 1957 and formation of Malaysia in 1963, the library was moved to Hang Tuah Hall in 1966. The moving ceremony was officiated by Minister of Finance Tan Siew Sin.

In 1975, the Malacca Public Library Corporation was enacted to establish the Malacca Public Library. Matters related to it was approved. The corporation was then established 2 years later in 1977 located at Hang Tuah Hall. In 1993, the Malacca Public Library Enactment (Amendment) Act 1993 went in force.

In 1996, the library moved to its current location at Bukit Baru and inaugurated by Governor of Malacca Syed Ahmad Syed Mahmud Shahabuddin on 4 November.

Collection
 Examination Section
 Lincoln Collection Section
 Loan Section
 Malacca Collection Section
 Publication Section
 Reference Section

Branches
In 1986, the Jasin branch of Malacca Public Library was established at JKR Building, Jasin Town. On 1 October 1999, the library was moved to a new building and inaugurated by Malacca Chief Minister Abu Zahar Ithnin on 11 November.

In 1988, the Alor Gajah branch of the library was established at UMNO Building, Alor Gajah Town. On 1 August 1998, the library was moved to a new place and was inaugurated by Malacca Chief Minister Abu Zahar Ithnin.

In 1992, the Masjid Tanah branch of the library was established at Lembaga Urusan Tabung Haji Building, Masjid Tanah Town. In 2005, another branch library was opened in May 2005.

In 1993, several library branches were opened, which are Air Tawar Village Library on 12 June, Felda Kemendore Village Library on 2 August 1993, Selandar Village Library on 18 October 1993 and Kuala Linggi Village Library on 20 December.

In 1994, the Rantau Panjang Village Library was established on 18 April.

Also in 1994, the Merlimau branch of the library was opened to the public on 1 June and inaugurated on 29 August. In 2003, the library was moved to a new building in Jasin Route and opened on 2 June.

In 1996, the Central Malacca branch of the library was established at Hang Tuah Mall after the main library was moved to Bukit Baru. In August 2001, the library was changed to Higher Education Institute Resource Center Library.

In 1997, the Pulau Sebang Village Library was established on 10 November.

In 1999, several library branches were opened again, which are Japerun Sungai Rambai Library on 2 February, Japerun Serkam Library, Japerun Durian Tunggal Library and Ayer Molek Darat Village Library on 1 June.

In 2000, the Felda Bukit Senggeh Village Library was established on 1 August and the Felda Bukit Sedanan Village Library was established on 1 September.

In 2001, the Kampung Padang Village Cyber Library was established on 3 July.

In 2002, several library branches were opened, which are Japerun Air Panas Library and Bertam Hulu Village Library on April, Japerun Bukit Asahan Library on 3 May, Tangga Batu Village Library on 15 June and Paya Rumput Village Library on 1 August.

In 2003, the Ilmu Air Limau Cyber Library and Ilmu Chenderah Cyber Library was established.

In 2004, the Menggong Village Library was established.

In 2005, the Klebang Village Cyber Library was established in January.

In 2006, the Telok Mas Town Library was established in October and the Telok Gong Village Library was established on 18 December.

In 2008, the Bukit Bulat Village Library was established on 15 February.

In 2010, the Malacca Planetarium Community Library was established on 4 January and inaugurated on 25 January. The ÆON Community Library was established on 5 February.

In 2012, the Sungai Rambai Village 1Malaysia Library was established on 24 March.

See also
 List of tourist attractions in Melaka
 National Library of Malaysia

References

External links
  

1977 establishments in Malaysia
Buildings and structures in Malacca
Public libraries in Malaysia
Tourist attractions in Malacca